Amphiplica venezuelensis is a species of small sea snail, a marine gastropod mollusk in the family Caymanabyssiidae, the false limpets.

Distribution
This marine species is found in the Venezuelan Basin, Venezuela.

Description 
The maximum recorded shell length is 14.8 mm.

Habitat 
Minimum recorded depth is 3518 m. Maximum recorded depth is 5057 m.

References

External links
 To USNM Invertebrate Zoology Mollusca Collection

Caymanabyssiidae
Gastropods described in 1988